The 1981–82 Combined Counties Football League season was the fourth in the history of the Combined Counties Football League, a football competition in England.

With the arrival of several new clubs, the league was split into two divisions – East and West. The Eastern Division was won by Malden Town, after they won the league the previous season. The Western Division was won by Ash United. There was a championship playoff, which was won 3–0 on aggregate by Ash United. There was no promotion or relegation, although some clubs left the league at the end of the season and it reverted to a single division.

The league switched to the system of three points for a win, instead of two.

Eastern Division

The Eastern Division featured eleven clubs, all from the previous season Combined Counties League.

League table

Western Division

The Western Division featured seven clubs from the previous season Combined Counties League along with four new clubs:
Alton Town, joining from the Athenian League.
Chobham, joining from the London Spartan League Premier Division.
Cove, joining from the Hampshire League.
Frimley Green, joining from the London Spartan League Senior Division.

League table

References

External links
 Combined Counties League Official Site

1981-82
1981–82 in English football leagues